The Flying Doctor is a 1959 British television series made in Britain and Australia. It starred Richard Denning and was credited by Michael Noonan. It ran for 39 episodes of 30 minutes.

It is not to be confused with the later TV series The Flying Doctors.

Cast
Richard Denning as Dr. Greg Graham
Jill Adams as Mary Meredith
Alan White as Charley Wood
James Copeland as Alec Macleod
Peter Madden as Dr. Jim Harrison

Background
The show was based on a BBC radio series of the same name. This starred Bill Kerr, James Mackechnie, and Bettina Dickson.

The series was filmed at Elstree studios in London with location work done in Australia. Finance came from Associated British of England.

In March 1958 two executives from Associated British, director David MacDonald and producer Hamilton Inglis, arrived in Australia to shoot footage. They said Michael Noonan would supervise the scripts and filming of at least 39 episodes would begin in a few weeks. They also said over 200 actors had been seen for the lead three roles. Noonan reported he had written the first season of 13 episodes and that the second season of 13 episodes had been completed by English writers or Australian writers living in England.

Background footage was shot in Australia in July 1958.

Michael Noonan later wrote a series of novels about the Flying Doctors featuring a Dr Jeremy James.

References

External links
The Flying Doctor at IMDb
The Flying Doctor at Nostalgia Centra
The Flying Doctor at CTVA

1959 British television series debuts
1959 Australian television series debuts
Television shows shot at Associated British Studios